Strigocossus is a genus of moths belonging to the family Cossidae. The genus was described by Constant Vincent Houlbert in 1916.

Species
Some species of this genus are:
Strigocossus ambahona (Viette, 1954)
Strigocossus crassa (Drury, 1782)
Strigocossus capensis (Walker, 1856)
Strigocossus cretacea (Butler, 1878)
Strigocossus elephas Yakovlev, 2013
Strigocossus guillemei (Houlbert, 1916)
Strigocossus hepialoides Yakovlev, 2011
Strigocossus kushit Yakovlev, 2011
Strigocossus mediopallens (D. S. Fletcher, 1968)
Strigocossus moderata (Walker, 1856)
Strigocossus ochricosta (D. S. Fletcher, 1968)
Strigocossus tandoensis (Bethune-Baker, 1927)

Former species
Strigocossus kilimandjarae (Le Cerf, 1914)
Strigocossus leucopteris Houlbert, 1916
Strigocossus vosseleri (Gaede, 1930)

References

Zeuzerinae